Football Club Internazionale Milano is an Italian association football club based in Milan, Lombardy. The club was formed on 9 March 1908 to allow the foreign players to play in Italy. Inter played its first competitive match on 10 January 1909 against their cross-town rivals Milan, in which they lost 3–2. The club won its very first title in 1910 – the 1909–10 Italian Football Championship. Since then, the club has won a further 17 league titles, along with seven Coppa Italias and five Supercoppa Italianas. They have also been crowned champions of Europe on three occasions by winning two European Cups back-to-back in 1964 and 1965 and then another in 2010. The club experienced the most successful period in their history from, 2006 to 2010, where the club won five successive league titles, equalling the all-time record, by adding three Italian Cups, three Italian Supercups, one UEFA Champions League and one FIFA Club World Cup. During the 2009–10, Inter become the first Italian team to win the Treble and only the second team to win five trophies in a calendar year, in 2010.

Since playing their first competitive match, more than 900 players have appeared in competitive first-team matches for the club, some of whom have played between 25 and 99 matches (including substitute appearances). Ronaldo, who than was signed by Inter for a then world record fee of $27 million, fell one short of 100 appearances for the club, due to various injuries during his Inter career. Maurizio Ganz and Mateo Kovačić played 98 and 97 matches in all competitions for Inter, respectively.

As of 28 May 2017, more than 280 players have played between 25 and 99 competitive matches for the club.

List of players

Appearances and goals are for first-team competitive matches only, including Serie A, Coppa Italia, Supercoppa Italiana, UEFA Europa League/UEFA Cup, European Cup/Champions League, Cup Winners' Cup, Inter-Cities Fairs Cup, Super Cup and Club World Cup matches. 
Players are listed according to the date of their first team debut for the club.

Statistics correct as of match played 28 May 2017. List may be not complete

Table headers
 Nationality – If a player played international football, the country or countries he played for are shown. Otherwise, the player's nationality is given as his country of birth.
 Inter career – The year of the player's first appearance for Inter Milan to the year of his last appearance.
 Starts – The number of games started.
 Sub – The number of games played as a substitute.
 Total – The total number of games played, both as a starter and as a substitute.

See also
 Serie A winning players
 Inter Milan and the Italy national football team
 Inter Milan Hall of Fame

Notes
 A utility player is one who is considered to play in multiple positions.

References

 
Players (25-99 appearances)
Inter Milan
Association football player non-biographical articles